The Xiangshan Harbor Bridge is a large cable-stayed bridge in Ningbo. The bridge carries 6 lanes of traffic between Xiangshan County and Yinzhou District of Ningbo, Zhejiang. The bridge, which was opened in 2012, is one of the largest cable-stayed bridges and one of the tallest in bridges in the world.

References

See also
List of largest cable-stayed bridges
List of tallest bridges in the world

Bridges in Zhejiang
Cable-stayed bridges in China
Bridges completed in 2012
Toll bridges in China